Das is a town and municipality in the comarca of Cerdanya, Girona Province, Catalonia, Spain. Its population is 222 according to the 2012 census. 
It is located amidst the mountains of the Pyrenees.

See also 
 Tosa d'Alp

References

External links

 Government data pages 

Municipalities in the Province of Girona
Municipalities in Cerdanya (comarca)
Populated places in the Province of Girona